The World Junior Wushu Championships (WJWC) is an international wushu competition organized by the International Wushu Federation (IWUF) for competitors below 18 years of age. There are three age groups for the Taolu events and there is also a Sanda category.

Editions
Source:

 2020 in Rabat, Morocco was cancelled.

Medals (2014 - 2022)

History

Taolu 
Group A has existed since the first rendition of the championships. The age group was originally 16-18 but changed to 15-17 as a result of a vote in 2019. From 2006 to 2012, Group A athletes were required to compete using the IWUF second set of compulsory routines. In 2014 and 2016, this was changed to the IWUF third set of compulsory routines. In early 2018, Group A were allowed to do optional routines instead of compulsory routines, and would be judged without the Degree of Difficulty requirement. 

Group A athletes who placed in the top six in the 2014 World Junior Wushu Championships were allowed to compete in the 2014 Summer Youth Olympics in Nanjing, China where Wushu was a demonstration sport. Wushu was also part of the 2014 Nanjing Sports Lab which was a promotional event for non-Olympic sports which also included sport climbing, skateboarding, and roller skating. Group A athletes who qualify would also be able to compete in the Wushu event at the 2022 Summer Youth Olympics in Dakar, Senegal, which has been postponed to 2026.

Group B has existed since the first rendition of the championships. The age group was originally 13-15 but changed to 12-14 as a result of a vote in 2019. Group B athletes have always been required to compete with the IWUF first set of compulsory routines.

Group C was introduced in 2008. The age group was originally 9-12 but changed to 7-11 as a result of a vote in 2019. Group C athletes have always been required to compete with the IWUF elementary routines.

Sanshou

See also
 Wushu (sport)
 World Wushu Championships
 International Wushu Federation
2014 Summer Youth Olympics

References

Wushu competitions
World Wushu Championships
Recurring sporting events established in 2006
World youth sports competitions